Calumma hilleniusi is a species of chameleon found in Madagascar.

References

Calumma
Reptiles of Madagascar
Reptiles described in 1973
Taxa named by Édouard-Raoul Brygoo
Taxa named by Charles Pierre Blanc
Taxa named by Charles Domergue